Ravi Deep (born Ravi Parkash; 30 December 1954) is an Indian theatre and television director, writer, and actor

Biography 

Ravi Deep started stage acting from his school days and got involved in modern theatre during college days at Kapurthala, a town in India. He along with Lalit Behl, Pramod Moutho, Satish Sharma and Harjit Walia made this small town a hub of modern theatre. He did his Masters in Dramatic Art from Punjabi University, Patiala in 1977. He did freelancing as theatre actor, director and writer. He wrote and directed short plays 'Rang Nagari' (The City of Colors), 'Kheench Rahe Hain' (Pulling On), 'Kaun Nachaye Nach?' (Who Makes Us Dance?), 'Satya Katha' (The True Story) and 'Mukti Bahini' (The Liberation Force). These plays won inter varsity contests for 4 consecutive years (1978–81). 'Rangmanch Ke Teen Rang' an anthology of his first three plays was published in March 1982. His plays are still being staged every year, mainly at University Contests. He also wrote & directed few children plays like 'Bagula Bhagat' and 'Bahurupiya'. His anthology of stories 'Bilav' was published in 2014.

Ravi Deep joined Doordarshan, the Public Service Broadcasting Organisation of India in April 1983 and shifted to programme production, writing and direction for television. He produced and directed TV Serials 'Buniad', 'Lafafi' and 'Parchhaven' besides a number of teleplays, telefilms, documentaries, and TV programmes. He won Doordarshan Award in 2008 in the Literary Adoption Category. He has four more nominations to his credit. He did Masters in Political Science (1980) and M Phil (1992). He has been the Programme Director of ABU Robocon India from 2007 to 2014.

Filmography

As creative head 

 Dhoop Chhaon, Hindi TV Serial, 2020–21

As director 

 Taalluq, Punjabi Telefilm, 2019
 Gunaah, Punjabi Telefilm, 2018
 Men & Machines: Par Excellence, English Documentary, 2018
 Cinema Shambhari, Series on Marathi Cinema, 2013–14 
 Bioscope, Feature Films based TV Show 2009–16
 Godavari Ne Kay Kele, Marathi Telefilm 2008
 Janakinama, Hindi Telefilm, 2007
 Qatalgaah, Hindi Telefilm, 2007
 Samander Ki Rani, Hindi Telefilm, 2007
 Kurukshetre Dharmkshetre, Hindi Telefilm, 2007
 Charting the Ocean, English Documentary, 2004
 Sarnawan, Punjabi TV Serial, 2000
 Sazaa, Punjabi Teleplay, 1998
 Hadasa, Punjabi Teleplay, 1998
 Balle Balle Shava Shava, New Year Eve Special TV Show, 1996 (Co-direction)
 Parchhaven, Punjabi TV Serial, 1996
 Mela Melian Da, TV Show
 Inkaar, Punjabi Teleplay
 Masiha, Punjabi Teleplay
 Matlab, Punjabi Teleplay
 Gas Regulator, Hindi Teleplay
 Chandigarh – Swapna Ek Sakaar, Documentary
 Lafafi, Punjabi TV Serial, 1993–94
 Ladayi, Teleplay, 1993
 Bebasi, Teleplay, 1993
 Necklace, Teleplay, 1993
 Dastak, New Year Eve Special TV Show, 1991
 Kujh Khatta Kujh Mittha, New Year Eve Special TV Show, 1990
 Chuniya, Hindi Telefilm, 1980
 The Battle of Hussainiwala, Documentary
 Subh Karman Te Kabahun Na Taron, Documentary
 Jain Art & Architecture: Punjab & Himachal Pradesh, Documentary
 Rashtriya Dhwaj, Feature on National Flag of India
 Ghumman Da Naat Lok, Feature on Theatre Personality Kapur Singh Ghuman
 Kullu Dasehra, Feature
 Dardmandan Dian Ahin, Feature 
 Sarankshan Upbhokta Ka, Feature
 Aaghosh, Hindi Telefilm, 1987 
 Munasib, Hindi & Punjabi Telefilm, 1987
 Taleem, Hindi Telefilm, 1986
 Rubaroo, Hindi Telefilm, 1986
 Bandish, Teleplay
 Shaheed, Punjabi Teleplay
 Sangharash, Hindi Telefilm, 1985
 Sailab, Hindi Telefilm, 1985
 Thes, Hindi Telefilm, 1985
 Jhotta, Punjabi Teleplay
 Ruliya, Punjabi Telefilm, 1985
 Buniyad Punjabi Serial, 1984
 Wapasi, Hindi Teleplay, 1983
 Kumarswami, Hindi Stage Play, 1982
 Nayak Katha, Hindi Stage Play, 1981
 Bakri, Hindi Stage Play
 Satyakatha, Hindi Stage Play, 1980
 Bahurupiya, Hindi Children Stage Play, 1979
 Muktivahini, Hindi Stage Play, 1979
 Kaun Nachaye Nach, Hindi Stage Play, 1979
 Kheench Rahe Hain, Hindi Stage Play, 1978
 Andhernagari Chaupat Raja, Hindi Stage Play, 1978
 Shuturmurg, Hindi Stage Play, 1978
 Rangnagari, Hindi Stage Play, 1977
 Chal Maar Udaari Udd Chaliye, Punjabi Stage Play, 1977 (Co-direction)
 Kya Number Badlega, Hindi Stage Play, 1977
 The Chairs, Hindi Stage Play, 1977
 Muktdhara, Hindi Stage Play, 1976

As writer 

 Siddhi, Punjabi Telefilm, 2022 (Story, Screenplay & Dialogues)
 Udeek, Punjabi Telefilm, 2021 (Story, Screenplay & Dialogues)
 Dhoop Chhaon, Hindi TV Serial, 2020-21 (Screenplay & Dialogues)
 Taalluq, Punjabi Telefilm, 2019 (Story, Screenplay & Dialogues)
 Gunaah, Punjabi Telefilm, 2018 (Story, Screenplay & Dialogues)
 Bisaat, Hindi Short film, 2018 (Story, Screenplay & Dialogues)
 New Year Eve Special Programme of DD National Channel, 2014–15
 Janakinama, Hindi Telefilm, 2007 (Screenplay)
 Qatalgaah, Hindi Telefilm, 2007 (Screenplay)
 Kurukshetre Dharmkshetre, Hindi Telefilm, 2007 (Screenplay)
 Zakham, 2 episodes of Punjabi TV Serial Sarnawaan, 2000 (Screenplay & Dialogues)
 Hadasa, Punjabi Teleplay, 1998 (Screenplay)
 Parchhaaven, Punjabi TV Serial, 1996 (Screenplay)
 Masiha, Punjabi Telefilm, 1995 (Story, Screenplay & Dialogues)
 Lafafi, Punjabi TV Serial, 1993–94 (Screenplay)
 Chuniya, Hindi Telefilm, 1990 (Screenplay & Dialogues)
 Aaghosh, Hindi Telefilm, 1987 (Story & Screenplay)
 Taleem, Hindi Telefilm, 1986 (Story, Screenplay & Dialogues)
 Rubaroo, Hindi Telefilm based on O Henry's story 'A Retrieved Reformation', 1986 (Screenplay & Dialogues)
 Sangharash, Hindi Telefilm, 1985 (Story, Screenplay & Dialogues))
 Sailab, Hindi Telefilm, 1985 (Story, Screenplay & Dialogues))
 Thes, Hindi Telefilm, 1985 based on Faneeshwar Nath Renu's story (Screenplay & Dialogues))
 Ruliya, Punjabi Telefilm, 1985 (Story, Screenplay & Dialogues))
 Buniyad, Punjabi TV Serial, 1984 (Story & Screenplay)
 Satyakatha, Play, 1980
 Bahurupiya, Hindi Children Stage Play, 1979
 Muktivahini, Stage Play, 1979
 Kaun Nachaye Nach, Play, 1979
 Kheench Rahe Hain, Play, 1978
 Rangnagari, Stage Play, 1977

As actor 

 Dhoop Chhaon, Hindi TV Serial, 2020–21
 Taalluq, Punjabi Telefilm, 2019
 Gunaah, Punjabi Telefilm, 2018
 Kurukshetre Dharmkshetre, Hindi Telefilm, 2007
 Main Ki Karan, Punjabi Teleplay, 1986
 Suryast, Hindi Stage Play, 1981
 Shuturmurg, Hindi Stage Play, 1978
 Chal Maar Udaari Udd Chaliye, Punjabi Stage Play, 1978
 Bakri, Hindi Stage Play, 1977
 The Chairs, Hindi Stage Play, 1977
 Suryast, Hindi Stage Play, 1977
 Anarkali, Urdu Stage Play, 1977
 Main Vi Haan Natak Di Pattar, Punjabi Stage Play, 1977
 Natthe Di Massi, Punjabi Stage Play, 1976
 Surya Ki Antim Kiran Se Surya Ki Pehli Kiran Tak, Hindi Stage Play, 1976
 Sakharam Binder, Stage Play, 1976
 Kya Number Badlega, Hindi Stage Play, 1974
 Hewers of Coal, Hindi Stage Play, 1973

As production designer 

Viji Amma, Documentary (credited as Ravi Mahajan)
 Sadaa-E-Vaadi, Hindi TV Serial, 2010
 Peele Patteyan Di Dastaan, Punjabi TV Serial
 Viji, TV Serial
 Khanabadosh, Urdu TV Serial, 2007
Khabbal, Punjabi Telefilm (credited as Ravi Mahajan)
Sunehri Jild, Punjabi Telefilm (credited as Ravi Mahajan)
Pankhudian, Punjabi TV Serial
 Roop Basant, Punjabi TV Serial
Ved Vyas Ke Pote, Hindi TV Serial (credited as Ravi Mahajan)
Mahasangram, Hindi TV Serial, 2000
 Kehar, Punjabi Telefilm, 1999
 Afsane, Hindi TV Serial
 Aatish, Hindi Telefilm
 Rani Kokilan, Punjabi Telefilm
 Chirion Ka Chamba, Hindi Telefilm
 Tapish, Hindi Telefilm

As voice over artist 
 Boonga Te Gosha, Moppets TV Show
 Ting Tong Teen, Puppets TV Show

Research Work 
Politics & Theatre in Punjab (Thesis for M Phil)

Awards and nominations

References

External links 
 Ravi Deep on imdb

Indian theatre directors
Indian television directors
Indian television writers
Indian male television actors
Living people
Indian male stage actors
1954 births
Indian production designers
20th-century Indian designers
21st-century Indian designers
Male artists from Punjab, India
Male television writers
20th-century Indian male artists
21st-century Indian male artists